Aphyllorchis queenslandica, commonly known as the yellow pauper orchid, is a leafless terrestrial mycotrophic orchid in the family Orchidaceae. It has up to twelve dull yellow flowers on a thin, fleshy, purple flowering stem and is endemic to tropical north Queensland where it grows in rainforest.

Description 
The labellum is a similar size to the petals, more or less boat-shaped and has three lobes. The middle lobe projects forwards and the side lobes curve upwards. Flowering occurs between May and October.

Taxonomy and naming
Aphyllorchis queenslandica was first described in 1965 by Alick William Dockrill from a specimen collected near Helenvale and the description was published in The Orchadian.

Distribution and habitat
It grows in rainforest, often close to streams.

Conservation
This species is listed as "Near threatened" under the Queensland Government Nature Conservation Act 1992.

References

External links 
 
 
 Nature's Powerhouse website contains a gallery of Lewis Roberts' botanical illustrations including Aphyllorchis queenslandica
 The "Australian Orchid Name Index" and "Australian Orchidaceae - Current Genera and Species Checklist" may be downloaded here as pdf files

queenslandica
Orchids of Queensland
Terrestrial orchids
Plants described in 1965